The Kubelie Mosque or Kapllan Beu Mosque is a historic mosque in Kavajë, Albania. This mosque was originally built here in 1735 under the Ottomans by Kapllan Beu. The Old Mosque (Xhamija e Vjetër), stood on the main street of the city, about 70m to the east of the current one.

Also named after its founder Kapllan Pasha, the Kubelie mosque had been described as a "grand, beautiful building, with a dome and a peristyle. Marble facades rise under the cypress trees with their Byzantine columns and their Arabian arches." After being destroyed by the Communists in the 1970s, the new mosque has a very simple style and is made of concrete and white color while the original mosque was an Ottoman stone building with beautifully coloured decorations on the inside.

See also
 Kapllan Pasha Tomb
 List of mosques in Albania

References

Buildings and structures in Kavajë
Mosques in Albania
Buildings and structures demolished in the 1970s
Mosques destroyed by communists